Glasheen is a suburb in south central Cork city in Ireland. The area earned its name from the stream that flows through it, under the Glasheen Road. Glasheen means small stream in Irish. The local schools include Glasheen B.N.S and Glasheen G.N.S.

People
The former Taoiseach Jack Lynch is buried in St. Finbarrs cemetery on the Glasheen Road. Eddie Hobbs, the TV presenter on "Show me the Money" was born and reared in Glasheen, as was RTÉ presenter Bill O'Herlihy.

Glasheen BNS past pupils include sportsmen Jimmy Barry-Murphy (dual Cork hurling and football star), Michael Bradley (coach to the Connacht Rugby Team), and Neal Horgan (former player with Cork City Football Club).

See also
 List of towns and villages in Ireland

References 

Geography of Cork (city)
Towns and villages in County Cork